Imhoff or Imhof is a German surname. Imhoff means "Im Garten wohnen Wir" which translates to "In the garden we live" in English. Notable people with the surname include:

Imhoff family, one of the oldest patrician families in the German city of Nuremberg
Berthold Imhoff (1868–1939), German-Canadian painter
Daniel Imhof (born 1977), Canadian footballer
Darrall Imhoff (1938-2017), American former professional basketball player
Dominic Imhof (born 1982), Canadian footballer, brother of Daniel Imhof
Eduard Imhof (1895–1986), Swiss professor of cartography
Facundo Imhoff (born 1989), Argentine volleball player
Floris van Imhoff (born 1964), Dutch curler
Fritz Imhoff (1891–1961), Austrian actor
Gary Imhoff (born 1952), American actor
Guillermo Imhoff (born 1982), Argentine footballer
Gustaaf Willem van Imhoff (1705–1750), governor of Ceylon and then the Dutch East Indies for the Dutch East India Company
Hans Imhoff (1922–2007), German industrialist and businessman
Hans Walter Imhoff (1886–1971), Swiss footballer
Joseph Imhoff (1871–1955), American painter
Juan José Imhoff (born 1988), Argentine rugby player
Karl Imhoff (1876–1965), German engineer and inventor of the Imhoff tank for sewage processing
Laura van Imhoff, Dutch curler and coach
Lawrence E. Imhoff (1895–1988), soldier, lawyer, and four-term U.S. Representative from Ohio
Martin Imhof (born 1949), American football player who played defensive end in the National Football League
Maximus von Imhof (1758–1817), German physicist
Roger Imhof (1875–1958), American actor and vaudeville and burlesque performer
Sigmund von Imhoff (1881–1967), Generalmajor in the German military during the Second World War

German-language surnames